Iaal (also spelt as Ī`āl, Iäal, Izal or I’aal) is a village in northern Lebanon.

Etymology
The name Iaal is derived from the sound donkeys make when braying. This was chosen in honour of the preeminent role donkeys played in logistics connecting the coastal and mountain regions through Iaal.

The village's alternative name, Izal, has its origin in Aramaic.

Location
It is situated within the Zgharta District of the North Governorate of Lebanon. Iaal lies at the foot of the Mount Lebanon range and has a road that runs up into the mountains (parallel to Wadi Iaal) passing through its borders. Neighbouring and nearby communities include Jdaydeh, Kfaryachit, Khaldieh, Morh Kfarsghab and Sakhra. Iaal is one of five predominantly Sunni towns in the Zgharta District.

Buildings
The most identifiable building in Iaal is the castle/fort built on the hilltop of the village centre: the Fortress of Iaal It was built in 1816 by Mustafa Agha Barbar (the Ottoman governor of Tripoli from 1798) because the area was considered strategic thanks to its panoramic views, which extend all the way down to the Mediterranean coast. The other identifiable building in Iaal is the mosque along the road that runs up into the mountains called Masjid al-Taqwa (Arabic for Mosque of Piety), built in 1994.

History
It appears that Iaal was inhabited prior to the arrival of Barbar, as evidenced by a census conducted by the Ottomans in 1555 showing that there were 34 males in the village at that time (females were excluded from the census). However, who these villagers were and where they originated from is unknown. What can be presumably safely deduced is that the modern descendants from Iaal are a product of Barbar, those serving him and those who were counted in the 1555 census. Based upon the 1555 census alone, there should be more than the few thousand people currently claiming an origin from Iaal, i.e. if the population was able to grow without the interference of many unnatural deaths (e.g. killings) and/or significant migration and subsequent loss of identity.

Agriculture
The land of Iaal is watered by Iaal Dam and its outflow of Wadi Iaal. This makes it fertile, sustaining a variety of produce and grazing animals, and has resulted in making Iaal famous for its olive tree gardens.

Climate
Iaal's climate is typical of a Mediterranean plain village: with heavy rains, mild winters and hot, dry, arid summers. Its average monthly temperatures are shown below:

People
Its inhabitants number about 1,000 people (although precise figures are unattainable). In 1988 Iaal had a total population of 903, and in 1998 its population increased by almost 20% to 1,082 people. However, these figures relate to all registered citizens originating from the village, including both residents in Lebanon and those who emigrated abroad. The people of Iaal are also all related to one another through common ancestors. The majority of people who trace their ancestry to the village actually live outside of Iaal. The overwhelming majority of these immigrants and their descendants live in Australia, primarily Sydney, in the local government areas of the Municipality of Kogarah (especially the suburb of South Hurstville) and the City of Liverpool. This diaspora community also runs the Iaal Charitable Association Inc. During the late 19th and early 20th century, most people from Iaal (at the time) emigrated to Latin America; however, these emigrants fully assimilated into their new environments and lost all connections with their homeland.

Some common surnames of people from Iaal include Affouf, Al-Choukairy, Al-Hage, Ardati, Ayyoub, Dennaoui, Diab, Dib, Elmir, Habib, Hadid, Halbouni, Hammoud, Hussein, Ibrahim, Issa, Jameel, Khidr, Mahrees, Merhi, Nasreddine, Nasser, Shehaddy, Subkhi and Taleb.

Notable people
Some notable people born in or descending from Iaal include:
Abdallah Elmir - one of the Board of Directors and the General Coordinator of the Future Movement of Australia (FMA). (Politically, the villagers of Iaal are mostly aligned with the Future Movement in Lebanon.)
Ahmad Elmir - Iaal Municipal Council Mayor (2004–2016).
Bianca Elmir (daughter of Ahmad) - Australian boxer 
Sam Elmir (son of Abdallah) - councillor in the East Ward of the Kogarah Municipal Council (2008–2012), councillor in the Blakehurst Ward of the Georges River Council (2017–), Georges River Council Deputy Mayor.
Rahma el-Dennaoui - Australian girl who went missing in 2005
Mohamed Hage - Australian Arab Chamber of Commerce and Industry NSW chairman.
Khoder Nasser (son of Yasser) - sports manager.
Yasser Nasser - former President of the Australian Federation of Islamic Councils (AFIC).

References

External links

General Iaal details. zgharta.com.
Iaal Charitable Association Inc. (ICAI). Serving the greater Iaal community from Australia in the name of God, est. 1963.
Ehden Family Tree

Sunni Muslim communities in Lebanon
Populated places in the North Governorate
Zgharta District